Centerview is a populated place in Pottawatomie County, Oklahoma, at an elevation of 988 feet.  It is located 4 miles south-southeast of Prague, Oklahoma, on US Route 377 at Moccasin Trail.

The 1936 WPA-constructed Centerview School still exists and has had an Oklahoma Landmarks Inventory Nomination.

References

Unincorporated communities in Pottawatomie County, Oklahoma
Unincorporated communities in Oklahoma